Carousel voting (in Russian карусель (karusel, "carousel")) is a method of vote rigging in elections, used particularly in Russia and Georgia, and alluding to fairground carousels. Usually it involves "busloads of voters [being] driven around to cast ballots multiple times". The term "carousel" refers to the circular movement made by the voters, from one polling station to the next.

In Russia
According to critics, the activity has been used in Russia since Vladimir Putin came to power in 2000. Voters are recruited through offers of payment and then meet up on the day of the election and are instructed by a leader as to what to do. Journalist Sergei Smirnov reported in 2012 that he was offered 2,000 roubles ($70) to vote four times for Putin in the presidential election. He was told to photograph the ballot papers and then send the photographs to his group leader. Smirnov also reported meeting people who said that they had been paid 5,000 roubles ($170) to vote in the previous year's parliamentary elections.

Who orders the carousels is not completely established. The Just Russia's member of State Duma Ilya Ponomarev has said that the fraud in Russia's electoral system has been created due to the initiative of local officials who wish to please their superiors: "Vladimir Putin has a system in place in which provincial authorities are obliged to hold up the result of the ruling party. They know that if they don't attain the right result they could lose their jobs".

In Ukraine
Carousel voting was one of several election fraud methods used by the Viktor Yanukovych campaign in the 2004 presidential election in Ukraine, which led to the mass protests known as the Orange Revolution, and to Ukraine's Constitutional Court decision to nullify election results and order a new election, which was won by Viktor Yushchenko.

Cases of carousel voting have also been reported during the 2012 Ukrainian parliamentary election.

See also 
 Bulgarian train

References

Politics of Russia
Electoral fraud
Politics of Ukraine